The table below is a summary of the stories published by Charles Hamilton during his career.

Listing

Stories published in book format

After World War II, story papers had stopped being published so Hamilton was obliged to publish his stories in book format. The style of the stories did not change.

As Frank Richards

Billy Bunter novels

"Jack" novels

Tom Merry novels

Other novels

as Hilda Richards

as Martin Clifford
[some of these were later reprinted with the author as Frank Richards]

as Owen Conquest

The Rivals of Rookwood (1951)

See also

 Charles Hamilton (writer)
 The Magnet
 The Gem
 Greyfriars School
 Billy Bunter
 Bessie Bunter
 Tom Merry

References
 .
 .

Specific

External links
 Friardale Hamilton material
 Magnets 
 Collecting Books and Magazines Detailed article 
 Greyfriars, The Magnet & Billy Bunter Facts and Figures
 Greyfriars Index Detailed listing of Hamilton material
 The Friars Club Enthusiasts’ Club
 The Magnet Detailed site about The Magnet
 Bunterzone Enthusiasts’ site
 Index of Boys Weeklies

British boys' story papers
Hamilton, Charles